This is a list of programs currently, formerly or soon to be broadcast nationally on SBS Television.

Dramas

SBS primetime flagship dramas are broadcast at 22:00, with each series airing on two consecutive nights: Mondays and Tuesdays Wednesdays and Thursdays, and Fridays and Saturdays.

Monday–Tuesday
For further details see Korean-language Wikipedia article: SBS 월화드라마.

1990s

2000s

2010s

2020s

Drama Special (Wednesday–Thursday)

For further details see Korean-language Wikipedia article: SBS 드라마 스페셜.

1990s

2000s

2010s

Friday–Saturday
For further details see Korean-language Wikipedia article: SBS 금토드라마.

Friday
For further details see Korean-language Wikipedia article: SBS 금요드라마.

Saturday–Sunday

Weekend Drama Theater
For further details see Korean-language Wikipedia article: SBS 주말극장

Weekend dramas
For further details see Korean-language Wikipedia article: SBS 주말드라마.

  (그래, 그런거야; 2016)
 Our Gap-soon (우리 갑순이; 2016–2017)

Weekend special project dramas
For further details see Korean-language Wikipedia article: SBS 주말 특별기획 드라마.

Saturday night dramas
For further details see Korean-language Wikipedia article: SBS 심야드라마.

Late Night Restaurant (심야식당 ; 2015)

Sunday night dramas
Let Me Be Your Knight (너의 밤이 되어줄게 ; 2021)

Monday–Friday

Morning soap opera
For further details see Korean-language Wikipedia article: SBS 아침연속극.

Evening daily dramas
For further details see Korean-language Wikipedia article: SBS 일일드라마.

Sitcoms
For further details see Korean-language Wikipedia article: SBS 시트콤.

Youth sitcom
  (나 어때; 1998–1999)
  (행진; 1999–2000)
  (골뱅이; 2000–2001)
  (딱좋아!; 2001–2002)
  (레츠고; 2002)
  (오렌지; 2002)

Daily sitcom
  (LA아리랑; 1995–1996)
  (아빠는 시장님; 1996–1997)
  (OK목장; 1997)
  (미스 & 미스터; 1997)
  (순풍산부인과; 1998–2000)
  (웬만해선 그들을 막을 수 없다; 2000–2002)
  (대박가족; 2002–2003)
  (똑바로 살아라; 2002–2003)
  (압구정 종갓집; 2003–2004)

Monday sitcom
  (초인가족 2017; 2017)
 Big Difference Korea
 Big Difference Korea #TheBeatFoesDown
 Current Time: The Spoof

Saturday sitcom
 Love is Live (사랑은 생방송; 1993–1994)
  (뉴욕스토리; 1997–1998)
 Money.com (돈.com; 2000)

Sunday sitcom
 Sergeant Oh (오경장; 1993–1994)
  (2001–2002; 여고시절)

Couple sitcom
  (허니허니; 2001–2002)

Weekly sitcom
  (형사; 2003–2004)
  (혼자가 아니야; 2004–2005)
  (귀엽거나 미치거나; 2005)
 Mackerel Run (달려라 고등어; 2007)
  (웰컴 투 더 SHOW; 2011)
 Salamander Guru and The Shadows (도롱뇽도사와 그림자 조작단; 2012)

Weekend sitcom
  (오박사네 사람들; 1993)

News and current affairs
  (모닝와이드, breakfast news & talk show; 10 December 1991 – present)
  (SBS 뉴스 (1010), late morning news; 1 December 2008 – present)
Current Time Korea (1 November 2021, an adaptation of the Current Time TV franchise)
  (SBS 생활경제; lifestyle & financial news; 5 October 2009 – 2014)
  (SBS 12 뉴스, midday news; 5 October 2009 – present)
  (주영진의 뉴스브리핑, daytime recent issue talk, 2 Jan 2017 – present)
  (SBS 오 뉴스, early evening news; 2 January 2017 – present)
 SBS 8 News (SBS 8 뉴스, main news; 9 December 1991 – present)
  (SBS 스포츠뉴스, sports news; 9 December 1991 – present)
  (SBS 나이트라인, late night news; 24 October 1994 – present)

Music, entertainment and variety shows

Current programs

Former programs

1990s

 Live TV songs 20 (생방송 TV 가요 20; 1993–1998)

 Ju Byung-jin Show (주병진쇼; 1993)
 Our Happy Saturday (기쁜 우리 토요일; 1994–2001)
 Good Friends (좋은 친구들; 1994–2003)
 Tonight's TV Entertainment (한밤의 TV연예; 1995–2016)

 Lee Hong-ryul Show (이홍렬 쇼; 1996–2001)
 Saturday Mystery Theater (토요미스테리 극장; 1997–1999)
 Lee Seung-yeon's Say Say Say (이승연의 세이세이세이; 1998)
 Kim Hye-soo Plus You (김혜수 플러스 유; 1998–2000)

2000s

 Truth Game (진실게임; 1999–2008)
 Challenge 1000 Songs (도전 1000곡; 2000–2014)
 Good Hunch Fun TV (좋은 예감 즐거운 TV; 2000–2001)
 Two Men Show (두 남자 쇼; 2000–2001)
 Nam Hee-suk's Unusual Night (남희석의 색다른 밤; 2000–2001)
 Music Enter (뮤직엔터; 2000–2001)
 Curiosity Paradise (호기심 천국; 2000–2002)
 Name of the Rose (장미의 이름; 2000–2002)
 Good Feeling Night (기분 좋은 밤; 2001)
 Park Su-hong & Park Kyung-lim's Beautiful Night (박수홍 박경림의 아름다운 밤; 2001–2002)
 Saturday is Fun (토요일은 즐거워; 2001–2002)
 Ultra Sunday Hurray (초특급 일요일 만세; 2001–2002)
 Game Show Fun World (게임쇼 즐거운 세상; 2001–2012)
 Countdown (카운트 다운; 2002)
 Shin Dong-yup & Nam Hee-suk's Man To Man (신동엽 남희석의 맨∥맨; 2002–2003)
 Shin Dong-yup & Kim Won-hee's Hey! Hey! Hey! (신동엽 김원희의 헤이!헤이!헤이!; 2002–2003)
 Comedy Town (코미디 타운; 2002–2003)
 Fun TV Heaven (재미있는 TV천국; 2002–2007)
 Beautiful Sunday (뷰티풀 선데이; 2002–2004)
 Open Your Heart (가슴을 열어라; 2003)
 Fort Boyard (보야르 원정대; 2003)
 TV Scholarship Committee (TV 장학회; 2003–2004)
 Ya Sim Man Man (야심만만; 2003–2008)
 Decision Taste vs. Taste (결정 맛대맛; 2003–2007)
 Survival Lance and Shield (서바이벌 창과 방패; 2003–2004)
 SBS Gayo Show (SBS 가요쇼; 2003–2004)
 Choi Su-jong Show (최수종 쇼; 2003–2004)
 People Looking For Laughter (웃음을 찾는 사람들; 2003–2010, 2013–2017)
 Real Situation Saturday (실제상황 토요일; 2003–2007)
 Lee Kyung-kyu's Good Time (이경규의 굿타임; 2004)
 Romance Concert (낭만 콘서트; 2004–2005)
 I Am (아이엠; 2004–2005)
 Cultwo's Star Coach (컬투의 스타 코치; 2004–2005)
 Kim Yong-man & Shin Dong-yup's Favorites (김용만 신동엽의 즐겨찾기; 2004–2005)
 Good Sunday (일요일이 좋다; 2004–2017)
 Quiz Show Best Men and Women (퀴즈쇼 최강남녀; 2005)
 Challenge! High & Low (도전! 하이&로; 2005)
 Cheerful Brain Search (유쾌한 두뇌검색; 2005)
 Know How (비법 대공개; 2005–2006)
 Yes! No? (있다! 없다?; 2005–2009)
 Challenge Success Generation (도전 성공시대; 2005–2006)
 Kim Yoon-ah's Music Wave (김윤아의 뮤직웨이브; 2005–2006)
 Gag 1 (개그1; 2006)
 Music Space (음악공간; 2006–2008)
 Hey Hey Hey Season 2 (헤이헤이헤이 시즌2; 2006–2007)
 Super! Viking (슈퍼! 바이킹; 2006–2007)
 Discover! TV Big Dictionary (발굴! TV대사전; 2007–2008)
 Burst! Mental Concentration (작렬! 정신통일; 2007)
 Lee Kyung-kyu & Kim Yong-man's Line Up (이경규 김용만의 라인업; 2007–2008)
 Quiz! Hexagon (퀴즈! 육감대결; 2007–2010)
 Star King (놀라운 대회 스타킹; 2007–2016)
 Battle 8 vs. 1 (대결 8대1; 2008)
 Mystery Hunters (미스터리 특공대; 2008)
 TV Oasis (TV오아시스; 2008)
 The Star Show (더 스타쇼; 2008)
 Ya Sim Man Man 2 (야심만만 2; 2008–2009)
 Intimate Note (절친 노트; 2008–2010)
 Kim Jung-eun's Chocolate (김정은의 초콜릿; 2008–2011)
 Identity (공통점을 찾아라; 2008)
 Because I Like You (좋아서; 2008–2009)
 Love Generation (연애시대; 2008–2009)
 Show! Korea Sings (쇼! 노래하는 대한민국; 2009)
 Battle! Star Chef (대결! 스타셰프; 2009)
 Star Junior Show (스타 주니어쇼 붕어빵; 2009–2015)
 Honey: The Lifetime Companion (자기야; 2009–2018)
 Strong Heart (강심장; 2009–2013)
 It's Okay You (괜찮아 유; 2009–2010)

2010s

 Ha-ha Mong Show (하하몽쇼; 2010)
 Tasty Invitation (맛있는 초대; 2010)
 
 Night After Night (밤이면 밤마다; 2010–2011)
 Real Korean Taste (진한맛; 2010–2011)
 Fun Quiz Club (재미있는 퀴즈클럽; 2011)
 Miracle Audition (기적의 오디션; 2011)
 Healing Camp (힐링캠프; 2011–2016)
 Quiz Show Multiply 9 (퀴즈쇼 곱하기 9; 2011–2012)
 
 Gag Tonight (개그 투나잇; 2011–2013)
 K-pop Star (K팝 스타; 2011–2017)
 100 Million Quiz Show (세대공감 1억 퀴즈쇼; 2012)
 Jung Jae-hyung & Lee Hyo-ri's You and I (정재형 이효리의 유&아이; 2012)
 GO Show (고쇼; 2012)
 SBS Knowledge Sharing Concert – I Love People (SBS 지식나눔 콘서트 – 아이러브 인; 2012–2014)
 E-King (전파왕; 2012–2013)
 Hwasin – Controller of the Heart (화신 – 마음을 지배하는 자; 2013)
 Barefooted Friends (맨발의 친구들; 2013)
 Thank You (땡큐; 2013)
 Friday is Chatter (금요일엔 수다다; 2013–2014)
 Survival Audition I'm Super Model (서바이벌 오디션 아임 슈퍼모델; 2013)
 World Challenge – We Are Coming (월드 챌린지 – 우리가 간다; 2013–2014)
 Heart Beats (심장이 뛴다; 2013–2014)
 Fashion King Korea (패션왕 코리아; 2013–2014)
 Oh! My Baby (오! 마이 베이비; 2014–2016)
 The Law of the City (도시의 법칙; 2014)
 Magic Eye (매직아이; 2014)
 Roommate (룸메이트; 2014–2015)
 Cook King Korea (쿡킹 코리아; 2014–2015)
 Eco Village – Happy Family! (에코빌리지 즐거운 家!; 2014–2015)
 Take Care of My Dad (아빠를 부탁해; 2015)
 Happy Today (해피 투데이; 2015)
 Some Guys, Some Girls (썸남썸녀; 2015)
 
 Same Family, Different Dreams (동상이몽 괜찮아 괜찮아; 2015–2016)
 The People's Dining Court (백종원의 3대 천왕; 2015–2017)
 The Fist of Fighting Spirit (주먹쥐고 소림사; 2015)
 New Star King (New 스타킹; 2015–2016)
 Baek Jong-won's Top 3 Chef King (2015-2017)
 Vocal wars: Voice of God (보컬 전쟁 : 신의 목소리; 2016)
 Fantastic Duo (판타스틱 듀오; 2016)
 Flower Crew (꽃놀이패; 2016–2017)
 
 Scene Stealer: Script Scholarship (씬스틸러 – 드라마 전쟁; 2016–2017)
  (본격 연예 한밤; 2016–2020)
 Game Show (게임쇼 유희낙락; 2016–2018)
 Fantastic Duo #2 (판타스틱 듀오 시즌2; 2017)
 Baek Jong-won's Food Truck (백종원의 푸드트럭; 2017)
  (스타일 팔로우; 2017)
 
 Baek Jong-won's Alley Restaurant (백종원의 골목식당; 2018–2021)
 Romance Package (2018)
 Have a good meal (폼나게 먹자; 2018)
 Reckless but Happy (2018)
 Little Forest (리틀포레스트; 2019)
 
 Delicious Rendezvous (맛남의 광장; 2019–2021)

2020s

 K-Trot in Town (트롯신이 떴다; 2020)
 Tiki-taCAR (티키타카; 2021)
 Loud (라우드; 2021)
 Golf Battle: Birdie Buddies (편먹고 공치리; 2021)
 The Soldiers (더솔져스; 2021)
 Fantastic Family-DNA Singer (판타스틱 팸일리; 2022)

Society, culture and education

 Unanswered Questions (그것이 알고 싶다; 1992–1995, 1996–present)
  (열린 TV 시청자 세상; 1993–present)
  (순간포착 세상에 이런일이; 1998–present)
  (TV 동물농장; 2001–present)
  (물은 생명이다; 2001–present)
  (잘먹고 잘사는 법; 2002–2016)
  (세상에서 가장 아름다운 여행; 2003–present)
  (생방송 투데이; 2003–present)
  (문화가중계; 2004–present)
  (SBS 토론공감; 2004–2013)
  (생활의 달인; 2005–present)
  (긴급출동 SOS 24; 2005–2011)
  (우리 아이가 달라졌어요; 2005–2015)
  (SBS 스페셜; 2005–present)
  (백세 건강시대; 2007–2014)
  (네트워크 현장! 고향이 보인다; 2008–present)
  (내 마음의 크레파스; 2008–2016)
  (궁금한 이야기 Y; 2009–present)
 Sunday Special Documentary (일요 특선 다큐멘터리; 2009–present)
  (꾸러기 탐구생활; 2010—present)
  (SBS 컬처클럽; 2010–2017)
  (현장 21; 2011–2014)
  (SBS 뉴스토리; 2014–present)
  (짝; 2011–2014)
  (여행의 기술; 2012)
 Human Documentary into Persons (휴먼다큐 사람속으로; 2012–2013)
  (네트워크 특선; 2012—present)
  (SBS 토론 공감; 2013)
 Discovery of Travel (여행의 발견; 2013)
  (SBS 이슈 인사이드; 2013–2015)
  (3시, 뉴스브리핑; 2015–2016)
  (달콤한 나의 도시; 2014)
  (영재발굴단; 2015–present)
  (창업스타; 2015)
  (맨 인 블랙박스; 2016—present)
 Worldwide Tasty Lesson (요리조리 맛있는 수업; 2017—present)

Animation and movies

 Movie Express (영화특급; 1991–2011)
 SBS Cine Club (SBS 시네클럽)
 SBS Anigallery (SBS 애니갤러리; 2007–2015)
 Animaniacs (애니매니악스)
 Animaniacs: Wakko's Wish (애니매니악스 : Wakko의 소원) (subtitled)
 Access! Ani-world (접속! 애니월드; 2015–present)
 Carrusel (천사들의 합창)
 Sonic the Hedgehog (고슴도치 소닉)
 Demetan Croaker, The Boy Frog (개구리 왕눈이)
 Martian Successor Nadesico (기동전함 나데카)
 Teenage Mutant Ninja Turtles (거북이 특공대)
 Teenage Mutant Ninja Turtles 2 (거북이 특공대 Z)
 The Irresponsible Captain Tylor (캡틴 테일러)
 Tank Knights Fortress (포트리스)
 The Raspberry Times (라즈베리 타임즈)
 Science Ninja Team Gatchaman (독수리 오형제)
 Mirmo! (미르모 퐁퐁퐁)
 Bananas in Pyjamas (내 친구 바나바나)
 Futari wa Pretty Cure (빛의 전사 프리큐어)
 Origami Fighters (접지전사)
 Duel Masters (듀얼 마스터즈)
 Crayon Shin-chan (짱구는 못말려)
 Olympus Guardian (올림포스 가디언)
 W.I.T.C.H. (마법소녀 위치)
 Tom and Jerry (톰과 제리)
 Teen Titans (틴 타이탄)
 Top Blade (탑블레이드)
 Top Blade V (탑블레이드V)
 Super Korean (슈퍼 코리언)
 Speed Racer (달려라 번개호)
 Pocket Monsters (포켓몬스터)
 Tokyo Mew Mew (베리베리 뮤우뮤우, Berry Berry Mew Mew)
 Aqua Kids (아쿠아 키즈)
 Yu-Gi-Oh! (유희왕)
 Dragon Ball (드래곤볼)
 Mashin Hero Wataru (미래전사 드래곤 파이터)
 Ragnarok the Animation (마법신화 라그나로크)
 Giga Tribe (기가 트라이브)
 White Mind Dog (하얀마음 백구)
 Cybertron (은하영웅 사이버트론)
 Banga Banga Hamtori (방가방가 햄토리)
 Cardcaptor Cherry (카드캡터 체리)
 Animal Yokocho (두근두근 비밀친구)
 The Prince of Tennis (테니스의 왕자)
 Winx Friends (윙스 프렌즈)
 MapleStory (메이플스토리)
 Dooly the Little Dinosaur (아기공룡 둘리)
 My Friend Haechi (내 친구 해치)
 Zoobles (쥬블스)
 Scan2Go (스캔2고)
 Magi-Nation (마법의 별, 매지네이션)
 Hello Jadoo (안녕 자두야)
 Daily Mom (매일엄마)
 Pretty Rhythm: Dear My Future (꿈의 보석 프리즘스톤)
 Top Plate (최강! 탑플레이트)
 Dodgeball King Tonki (피구왕 통키)
 Victory's 20,000 Leagues in the Space (빛돌이 우주 2만리)
 The Powerpuff Girls (파워퍼프걸)
 Robot Trains (로봇트레인)

Sports
 FIFA World Cup

See also
 List of programs broadcast by Arirang TV
 List of programmes broadcast by Korean Broadcasting System
 List of programs broadcast by Munhwa Broadcasting Corporation
 List of programs broadcast by tvN
 List of programs broadcast by JTBC

Notes

References

External links
  

Seoul Broadcasting System
 
 
SBS
Seoul Broadcasting System